C65 or C-65 may refer to:
 Autovía C-65, a road in Catalonia, Spain
 Berlin Defence (chess), a chess opening
 Caldwell 65, a spiral galaxy
 Caudron C.65, a French biplane
 Commodore 65, a prototype home computer 
 Honda Super Cub, a motorcycle
 Siemens C65, a mobile phone
 Stout XC-65, an American experimental aircraft
 C65, a racing car chassis from Courage Compétition